Scarlet Scarab is the name of two fictional characters appearing in American comic books published by Marvel Comics. Created by Roy Thomas, Archie Goodwin, and Frank Robbins,  Abdul Faoul, the first Scarlet Scarab, made his first appearance in The Invaders #23 (December 1977). The second Scarlet Scarab, Mehemet Faoul, was created by Doug Moench and Alan Kupperberg, and made his debut in Thor #326 (December 1982).

May Calamawy stars as Layla El-Faouly in the Marvel Cinematic Universe television series Moon Knight (2022), with the character becoming the Scarlet Scarab in its final episode.

Publication history
According to Roy Thomas, the Scarlet Scarab, like the Silver Scarab in Infinity, Inc., was an homage to the Dan Garret incarnation of the Blue Beetle "about whom I had written my second professional comics story back in 1965." The creators of the Ruby Scarab were named Garret and Dann.

Abdul Faoul 
The first Scarlet Scarab first appeared in The Invaders #23 (December 1977), and was created by Roy Thomas, Archie Goodwin, and Frank Robbins. The character also appeared in The Invaders #25 (February 1978).

Mehemet Faoul 
The second Scarlet Scarab first appeared in Thor #326 (December 1982), and was created by Doug Moench and Alan Kupperberg. He received an entry in the original The Official Handbook of the Marvel Universe #9.

Fictional character biography

Abdul Faoul
Abdul Faoul was a famous archaeologist during World War II. He unearthed the Ruby Scarab, an artifact that was originally created to battle the Elementals, around 3500 B.C. When Dr. Faoul touched the mystical power-object, he became the Scarlet Scarab and became a champion of Egypt during World War II.

Dr. Faoul worked as a liaison between the Allied Forces and the Egyptian government, and led the Human Torch and Namor to a recently excavated pyramid in search of the fanatic nationalist group, the Sons of the Scarab, which was actually led by Faoul. He tricked the heroes into opening the vault where the fist-sized ruby was kept. As the Scarlet Scarab, he first ousted the British, and then the Nazis, from Egypt. Following the war, the Scarlet Scarab continued to battle criminals until one day in the 1950s, the ruby simply disappeared.

Dr. Faoul had not realized that the gem's crafter, a powerful pre-dynastic Egyptian sorcerer named Garret, had placed an enchantment on it that it would return to Garret's tomb whenever it had exhausted its store of mystical power. Faoul spent the next twenty years in search of the ruby, not realizing it had returned to where he had found it. Eventually, the Elementals sent N'Kantu, the Living Mummy to fetch the ruby. The ruby changed hands a number of times after N'Kantu recovered it, going from the Living Monolith, a thief named Daniel "the Asp" Aspen, the Elementals, and an extra-dimensional traveler named Hecate. Meanwhile, Dr. Faoul continued searching until his death. As his dying act, he requested his son Mehemet to continue his quest.

Mehemet Faoul
Mehemet received from his father the strongbox in which he had kept the Ruby Scarab. Inside was the costume he had worn as the Scarlet Scarab, a journal of his exploits, and a photo of the ruby. Mehemet considered it his duty to continue his father's quest, searching for years as his father had. Finally, Mehemet came to the gem's final resting place. Holding the ruby, he gained the powers of the Scarlet Scarab, and set out to become Egypt's new champion. One of his goals was the protection of Egypt's priceless ancient artifacts. In one mission to recover some stolen artifacts, the Scarlet Scarab encountered Thor, who mistook his intentions and the two fought to a standstill.

Powers and abilities 
Abdul and Mehemet have superhuman strength and durability, the ability to fly at high speeds, the ability to fire concussive bursts of mystical energy, and the ability to sap the power from others on contact. Abdul needed to maintain contact with the Scarab to use its power.

In other media

Television 
 May Calamawy stars in the Marvel Cinematic Universe television series Moon Knight (2022) as Layla El-Faouly, an archaeologist and adventurer who is Marc Spector's wife. El-Faouly's backstory is based on Marlene Alraune, Spector's wife in the comics, who was changed from Caucasian to Egyptian at the suggestion of lead director Mohamed Diab, and is also the daughter of an archaeologist murdered by one of Spector's associates. El-Faouly becomes the Scarlet Scarab in the sixth episode, "Gods and Monsters", after accepting to be the temporary avatar of the Egyptian goddess Taweret, with this name being confirmed by Marvel.com following the episode's release. Diab noted he had not connected her to that character from the comics, explaining, "Sometimes Marvel picks a name and then gives it to the character that is developed." He pointed out that at the moment, she did not receive her powers from the scarab, but ultimately felt what the character represented was more important than her name.

References

External links

Articles about multiple fictional characters
Characters created by Archie Goodwin (comics)
Characters created by Doug Moench
Characters created by Frank Robbins
Characters created by Roy Thomas
Comics characters introduced in 1977
Comics characters introduced in 1982
Egyptian superheroes
Fictional archaeologists
Fictional characters with superhuman durability or invulnerability
Marvel Comics characters with superhuman strength
Marvel Comics male superheroes
Marvel Comics male supervillains
Marvel Comics superheroes
Marvel Comics supervillains